Christopher Walton Cooper (born July 9, 1951) is an American actor. He has appeared in several major Hollywood films, including American Beauty (1999), October Sky (1999), The Bourne Identity (2002), Seabiscuit (2003), Capote (2005), Syriana (2005), The Kingdom (2007), Where the Wild Things Are (2009), The Town (2010), The Muppets (2011), Cars 3 (2017), A Beautiful Day in the Neighborhood (2019), and Little Women (2019). He also portrayed Sheriff July Johnson in the acclaimed miniseries Lonesome Dove, which became one of the most successful Westerns in history.

Cooper won both the Academy Award and Golden Globe Award for Best Supporting Actor for his role as John Laroche in the 2002 film Adaptation. He played a lead role in the historical and political thriller Breach (2007), playing FBI agent and traitor Robert Hanssen. He played Daniel Sloan in the 2012 political thriller The Company You Keep, and Norman Osborn in The Amazing Spider-Man 2 (2014). He also portrayed Al Templeton on the 2016 Hulu miniseries 11.22.63.

He is a frequent collaborator with director John Sayles, including Matewan (1987), City of Hope (1991), Lone Star (1996), Silver City (2004) and Amigo (2010).

Early life
Cooper was born on July 9, 1951, in Kansas City, Missouri, the son of Charles and Mary Ann (Walton) Cooper.  He has an older brother, Chuck Cooper (born 1948). His father was both a United States Air Force doctor and a cattleman, and his mother was a housewife.  Both of his parents were from Texas. Cooper grew up in the suburbs of Kansas City, and spent his summers at his family's cattle ranch, located about 15 miles west of Leavenworth, Kansas.  He was also raised in Las Vegas, Phoenix, and Houston.  While attending Southwest High School in Kansas City, Cooper worked for a local theater company: "I had a background in carpentry, so I could build sets and work in the wings and shift scenes in the evening." After he graduated from high school, Cooper became the shop foreman for another repertory company. He also considered helping his father raise cattle for a living. Cooper served in the Coast Guard Reserve.

Cooper attended the University of Missouri and enrolled in the theater program, originally majoring in set design. It was during his sophomore year when Cooper changed his major to acting in order to overcome his "overpowering shyness." Cooper, therefore, took acting classes at the University of Missouri.  He recalled in a 1996 interview with The Philadelphia Inquirer, "I started going in and watching some shows at the theater department. I started taking theater classes and auditioned for plays. And once I got into it, it was pretty immediate. I really felt right, felt at home."  Cooper also took dance classes at Stephens College.

After he graduated from the University of Missouri, Cooper moved to New York City in 1976.  While living in New York, Cooper shared a one-bedroom railroad flat with four other aspiring actors and dancers. He supported himself by renovating apartments. In addition, he worked in construction and served as a janitor and a chauffeur. At the same time, he studied with Stella Adler and Wynn Handman. Prior to his film debut with Matewan (1987), Cooper spent the previous twelve years doing stage work with the Actors Theater of Louisville and the Seattle Repertory.  In 1985, Cooper appeared in the London revival of Sweet Bird of Youth.

Career
Cooper's early performances include John Sayles' 1987 film Matewan; the 1989 CBS-TV Western miniseries Lonesome Dove; the 1991 indie Western drama Thousand Pieces of Gold, and the 1992 ABC-TV docudrama Bed of Lies, opposite Susan Dey.

Some of his more notable later performances include: Money Train, as a psychotic pyromaniac who terrifies toll booth operators; Lone Star, in a  leading role as a Texas sheriff charged with solving a decades-old case; as Deputy Dwayne Looney in director Joel Schumacher's 1996 film A Time to Kill (based on the John Grisham novel); as Frank Booker in 1998's The Horse Whisperer; and as a closeted homophobic Marine Corps colonel in American Beauty, a role that garnered him a Screen Actors Guild Award nomination for Best Supporting Actor. To get into character, Cooper said he "depended on a friend who'd fought in Vietnam. I asked him to go deep. What would this man have done? What would be on his walls? On his desk?"

In 2000, Cooper played Colonel Harry Burwell (inspired by Lieutenant Colonel Henry "Light Horse Harry" Lee) in The Patriot. He was nominated for another Screen Actors Guild Award, a BAFTA Award, and won an Academy Award for Best Supporting Actor and a Golden Globe Award in 2003 for playing the role of John Laroche in Adaptation. In 2002, Cooper also appeared in The Bourne Identity as a ruthless CIA special ops director, a role he reprised (in flashbacks) in The Bourne Supremacy.

Cooper received another Screen Actors Guild Award nomination for his supporting role as racehorse trainer Tom Smith in 2003's Seabiscuit. In 2004, Cooper starred in Silver City, playing an inept Republican gubernatorial candidate, a character noted for similarities to U.S. President George W. Bush.

Cooper appeared in three acclaimed films in 2005: Jarhead (which reunited him with American Beauty director Sam Mendes and October Sky actor Jake Gyllenhaal); Capote; and Syriana. He also acted in the thriller Breach, playing real-life FBI agent and traitor Robert Hanssen. Cooper commented that Breach was "the first studio film where they've considered me the lead [actor]". In 2007, he appeared as a government agent in dangerous territory in the action thriller The Kingdom and voiced the character Douglas in the film adaptation of Maurice Sendak's book, Where the Wild Things Are (2009).

At the 2010 Sundance Film Festival, Cooper appeared alongside Ben Affleck in  The Company Men, early reviews of which praised Cooper's performance as "pitch-perfect".

In 2011, Chris Cooper appeared in The Muppets as Tex Richman, the antagonistic oil tycoon who is unable to laugh. In the musical film, Cooper performed the rap and dance number "Let's Talk About Me".

In 2017, he and Laurie Metcalf starred in A Doll's House, Part 2, a Broadway play by Lucas Hnath based on Henrik Ibsen's A Doll's House, for which he received a Tony Award nomination. Cooper played Nora Helmer's husband, Torvald.

Cooper portrayed Norman Osborn in the 2014 film The Amazing Spider-Man 2. He appeared in an uncredited role in Ben Affleck's crime drama Live by Night, which was released in December 2016.

In 2019, Cooper starred in two acclaimed films, Marielle Heller's A Beautiful Day in the Neighborhood, with Tom Hanks, and Greta Gerwig's adaptation of Little Women with an ensemble cast featuring Saoirse Ronan, Emma Watson, Florence Pugh, Timothée Chalamet, Laura Dern, and Meryl Streep.

Personal life

Cooper met his future wife, Marianne Leone, in 1979 at an acting class in New York City.  On their first date, she helped him carry sheet rock up eight flights of stairs: "That's when I knew this was the girl for me."  They married in July 1983.  Their son, Jesse Lanier Cooper, was born three months prematurely in October 1987.  Three days after he was born, Jesse suffered a cerebral hemorrhage and developed cerebral palsy.  Jesse was eventually mainstreamed into Silver Lake Regional High School, where he became an honor student.  Cooper recalled in a 2003 interview with The Morning Call, "(Jesse) is the best thing that ever happened to us. He's in a wheelchair and he communicates only by computer, but he's taught me so much because he's just so incredibly focused.  Now he's in a regular school, which we fought to get him into. He's an honors student, and he's doing great." On January 3, 2005, Jesse Cooper died suddenly and unexpectedly from epilepsy.  A memorial fund was set up in his name, the Jesse Cooper Foundation. Cooper has said that the death of his son has somewhat helped him understand several characters he played, such as Charles Aiken in August: Osage County (2013) and Phil Eastwood in Demolition (2015).

Cooper formerly maintained residences in Hoboken, New Jersey, and Plymouth, Massachusetts.  As of 2003, he resides in Kingston, Massachusetts.  He has been close friends with frequent collaborator John Sayles since 1985.  On May 14, 2016, Cooper received an honorary doctorate from the University of Massachusetts Lowell.

He and his wife Marianne adopt and live with rescue dogs.

Filmography

Film

Television

Stage

Video games

Awards and nominations

References

External links

 
 
 

1951 births
Living people
Male actors from Kansas City, Missouri
American male film actors
American male television actors
American male voice actors
Audiobook narrators
Best Supporting Actor Academy Award winners
Best Supporting Actor Golden Globe (film) winners
Outstanding Performance by a Cast in a Motion Picture Screen Actors Guild Award winners
United States Coast Guard enlisted
Stephens College faculty
University of Missouri alumni
20th-century American male actors
21st-century American male actors
People from Kingston, Massachusetts
United States Coast Guard reservists